The 1966 season was the Chicago Bears' 47th in the National Football League.  The team failed to improve on their 9–5 record from 1965 and finished with a  5–7–2 record under head coach George Halas, earning them a fifth-place finish in the NFL Western Conference. This was the franchise's second losing season in the past three.

Offseason

NFL draft

Roster

Schedule

Standings

Game summaries

Week 4: vs. Baltimore Colts

References

Chicago Bears
Chicago Bears seasons
Chicago Bears